The 1980–81 Anglo-Scottish Cup was the sixth and last edition of the tournament. It was won by Chesterfield, who beat Notts County in a two-legged final by 2–1 on aggregate.

English Group

Group A

Group B

Group C

Group D

Scottish Group

1st Round 1st Leg 
{|
|-
|valign="top"|

1st Round 2nd Leg 
{|
|-
|valign="top"|

Quarter-finals 1st Leg

Quarter-finals 2nd Leg

Semi-finals 1st Leg

Semi-finals 2nd Leg

Final 1st Leg

Final 2nd Leg

Notes and references

1980–81 in English football
1980–81 in Scottish football